Brett Clark may refer to:

 Brett Clark (ice hockey) (born 1976), Canadian professional ice hockey defenceman 
 Brett Clark (sociologist), professor of sociology at the University of Utah 
 Brett Clark (rugby league) (born 1961), Australian rugby league player
 Brett Clark, Maungakiekie-Tāmaki Local Board member

See also
Brett Clarke (disambiguation)